Aquilino Bonfanti (25 February 1943 – 12 April 2016) was an Italian professional football player who played as a midfielder.

References

1943 births
2016 deaths
Italian footballers
Serie A players
Serie B players
Serie D players
A.C. Milan players
Calcio Lecco 1912 players
Inter Milan players
Hellas Verona F.C. players
Catania S.S.D. players
U.S. Catanzaro 1929 players
Reggina 1914 players
U.S. Pistoiese 1921 players
Carrarese Calcio players
Association football midfielders
Pol. Alghero players